Fithian may refer to:

Fithian, Illinois
Philip Vickers Fithian